Nathan Sonenshein (August 2, 1915 – April 13, 2001) was a rear admiral in the United States Navy. 

A native of Lodi, New Jersey, Sonenshein began his four-decade naval career by attending and receiving a commission from the U.S. Naval Academy. 

In 1970, Sonenshein was head of the Navy's Bureau of Ships, just before it became the Naval Ship Systems Command. After the Navy awarded the DX program to Litton-Ingalls shipyard, he told leaders of Bath Iron Works that he foresaw no future naval work going to the Maine shipyard. This spurred Bath to make a series of improvements that helped it win the right to design and build the first Oliver Hazard Perry frigates and Arleigh Burke destroyers. 

Sonenshein retired from the Navy in 1974, and took up residence in Fairfax, Virginia. He moved to Moraga, California, less than a decade later and became assistant to the president of Global Marine Development, Inc., in Newport Beach, California. In 1982, he received the American Society of Naval Engineers' Harold E. Saunders Award, which honors "an individual whose reputation in naval engineering spans a long career of notable achievement and influence." In 1983, he was a member of the Marine Board of the Commission on Engineering and Technical Systems of the National Research Council. During his tenure, the board produced a report, "Criteria for the Depths of Dredged Navigational Channels".

On July 1, 1984, he was appointed by President Ronald Reagan to a two-year term as one of eight members of the National Advisory Committee on Oceans and Atmosphere. The Reagan Administration's choices for the panel membership drew criticism from environmentalists, who noted that it included no atmospheric scientists.

One of the committee's more controversial reports during his tenure suggested that U.S. shipyards be allowed to go out of business rather than be propped up by government subsidy. The report, released July 16, 1985, concluded that the country's shipyard capacity is "considerably greater" than would be required in a major conventional war. Using classified Pentagon studies, the report concluded that shipyards could expand production by 3½ to six times, providing all the new ships that would be needed. "Look at England in the Falklands", Sonenshein told the Washington Post. "In less than two months, they were able to modify and convert some 50 of their merchant ships that were then used for naval operations...Sure, it's always better to have more shipyards and more merchant ships to give you a margin of safety. But the hard question is, are you going to pay for it? I wouldn't pay for any more than we now have."

Sonenshein died at Kaiser Permanente in San Rafael, California, aged 85. He was buried at Oakmont Cemetery in Lafayette, California.

He was an uncle of political science professor Raphael Sonenshein and a brother of Israel L. Sonenshein, who was general counsel of the Federal Security Agency in Washington in the late 1940s and early 1950s and helped draft federal laws on Social Security and child support.

References

External links 
Genealogical info on extended family
1982 Harold E. Saunders Award: RADM Nathan Sonenshein, USN (Ret.) - American Society of Naval Engineers

1915 births
2001 deaths
United States Navy admirals
People from Lodi, New Jersey
United States Naval Academy alumni
Military personnel from New Jersey